Muhammed Zafar Iqbal (born 23 December 1952) is a Bangladeshi science fiction author, physicist, academic, activist and former professor of computer science and engineering and former head of the department of Electrical and Electronic Engineering at Shahjalal University of Science and Technology (SUST).  He achieved his PhD from University of Washington. After working 18 years as a scientist at California Institute of Technology and Bell Communications Research, he returned to Bangladesh and joined Shahjalal University of Science and Technology as a professor of Computer Science and Engineering. He retired from his teaching profession in October 2018. He is considered one of Bangladesh's top science fiction writers.

Early life and education
Muhammed Zafar Iqbal was born on 23 December 1952 in Sylhet of the then East Pakistan. His father, Faizur Rahman Ahmed, was a police officer who was killed in the Liberation War of Bangladesh. His mother was Ayesha Akhter Khatun. He spent his childhood in different parts of Bangladesh because of the transferring nature of his father's job. His elder brother, Humayun Ahmed, was a prominent writer and filmmaker. His younger brother, Ahsan Habib, is a cartoonist who is serving as the editor of the satirical magazine, Unmad. He has three sisters - Sufia Haider, Momtaz Shahid and Rukhsana Ahmed.

Iqbal passed the SSC exam from Bogra Zilla School in 1968 and the HSC exam from Dhaka College in 1970. He earned his bachelor's and master's in physics from the University of Dhaka in 1976 and then went to the University of Washington to earn his Ph.D. in 1982.

Career

Academic
After obtaining his PhD degree, Iqbal worked as a post-doctoral researcher at California Institute of Technology (Caltech) from 1983 to 1988 (mainly on Norman Bridge Laboratory of Physics). He then joined Bell Communications Research (Bellcore), a separate corporation from the Bell Labs (now Telcordia Technologies), as a research scientist. He left the institute in 1994.

Upon returning to Bangladesh, Iqbal joined the faculty of the CSE department at SUST.

Iqbal serves as the vice president of Bangladesh Mathematical Olympiad committee. He played a leading role in founding the Bangladesh Mathematical Olympiad and popularized mathematics among Bangladeshi youths at local and international level. In 2011, he won the Rotary SEED Award for his contribution in the field of education.

On 26 November 2013, Iqbal and his wife professor Haque applied for resignation soon after the university authority had postponed the combined admission test for the SUST and Jashore University of Science Technology. However they withdrew their resignation letters on the next day after the authority decided to go on with holding combined admission tests.

To make the NCTB text book "easy" and "learner friendly", in November 2017, there was a new revision of the secondary education class 9-10 text books for 2018, whose six books were revised under Iqbal and Mohammad Kaykobad's leadership. He is also the first co-author and chief editor of multiple new NCTB text books of 2023 including class 7's text book "Science (Investigative Study)" where some lines and pictures were plagiarised from different websites including National Geographic Education Resource Library website and in case of Bangla Version of the text book, because of erroneous translation it was alleged that those texts were translated into Bangla "using Google Translate". Later he admitted the issue of plagiarism and admitted his fault as the chief editor.

Literary
Iqbal started writing stories at a very early age. He wrote his first short story at the age of seven. While studying at the University of Dhaka, Iqbal's story "Copotronic Bhalobasha" (Copotronic Love) was published in Weekly Bichitra. Later he rewrote the story and published it as a collection of stories titled Copotronic Sukh Dukho.
he wrote numerous books for teenagers, such as novels, science fiction, and adventure books. Several of his books are:

Political stance
Iqbal is known for his stance against Jamaat-e-Islami Bangladesh and has spearheaded criticism of its leaders, several of whom were undergoing trial at the International Crimes Tribunal for their role in the Bangladesh liberation war in 1971. Iqbal's father was allegedly killed by Jamaat leader Delwar Hossain Sayeedi. He came down heavily on a section of the media for their stand against holding the 10th parliamentary elections in Bangladesh on 5 January 2013, amid a boycott by the main opposition party, alleging that those who were calling for halting the electoral process were actually trying to ensure the participation of Jamaat-e-Islami in the election.

In support of the war crime trials carried out at the premises of the International Crimes Tribunal in Bangladesh, he participated and featured prominently at the 2013 Shahbag protests.

Iqbal survived a stabbing attack in the head on 3 March 2018 in a prize-giving ceremony in SUST campus in Sylhet. Foyzur, the attacker, a 25-year-old male, was arrested after he had been beaten by the students. The attacker claimed that he had tried to kill him because the attacker believed he was an "enemy of Islam".

Works

Iqbal is one of the pioneers of science fiction in the Bengali language. He mainly writes for younger readers. He has also written several non-fiction books on physics and mathematics. He writes columns in mainstream newspapers regularly. Zafar Iqbal also writes storylines for the famous Bengali “Dhaka Comics.”

He writes a detective book series titled, Tuntuni o Chotachchu. Chotachchu is a short form of 'Choto Chachchu' which lexically translates to 'Small Uncle'; it means, 'the youngest uncle'.

Tuntuni o Chotachchu
 Tuntuni o Chotachchu
 Aro Tuntuni o Aro Chotachchu
 Abaro Tuntuni o Abaro Chotachchu
 Tobuo Tuntuni Tobuo Chotachchu
 Jokhon Tuntuni Tokhon Chotachchu
 Jerokom Tuntuni Sherokom Chotachchu
 Yetuku Tuntuni Setuku Chotachchu
 Aha Tuntuni Uhu Chotachchu

Personal life

Iqbal married Yasmeen Haque in 1978. She was the Dean of the Life Science Department and Professor of the Department of Physics at SUST. They have a son, Nabil Iqbal, working as a scientist at Durham University and a daughter, Yeshim Iqbal, a research scientist at Global TIES for Children at New York University after completed her Ph.D. from the same institution.

Awards 

 Agrani Bank Shishu Shahitto Award (2001)
 Quazi Mahbubulla Zebunnesa Award (2002)
 Khalekdad Chowdhury Literary Award (2003)
 Sheltech Literary Award (2003)
 Uro Child Literary Award (2004)
 Md. Mudabber-Husne ara literary Award (2005)
 Marcantile Bank Ltd. Award (2005)
 One of the 10 living Eminent Bengali (2005)
 American Alumni Association Award (2005)
 Dhaka University Alumni Association Award (2005)
 Sylhet Naittamoncho Award (2005) 
 Bangla Academy Literary Award (2005)
 Best Playwright Meril Prothom Alo Awards (2005) 
 Uro Child Literary Award (2006)
 Rotary SEED Award (2011)
 National ICT Award (2017)

References

External links

Muhammed Zafar Iqbal on Mendeley

1952 births
Living people
People from Sylhet
Family of Humayun Ahmed
Dhaka College alumni
University of Dhaka alumni
University of Washington alumni
Bangladeshi non-fiction writers
Bangladeshi science fiction writers
Bangladeshi physicists
Bangladeshi male writers
Bengali writers
Bengali-language writers
Bengali-language science fiction writers
Recipients of Bangla Academy Award
Bangladeshi textbook writers
Best Story National Film Award (Bangladesh) winners
Male non-fiction writers